Leen is a name of multiple origins. It is a popular Arabic name for girls meaning “tender” and “delicate”. It is spelled لِينٌ in Arabic and has been translated into English in multiple spellings.

It can also be a unisex given name of Dutch origin. As a name for girls, it can be a Dutch short form of the name Heleene. As a masculine name, it can be a Dutch short form of Leendert.

People with the name include:

Leen Barth (born 1952), Dutch former footballer
Leen Buis (1906–1986), Dutch road cyclist
Leen Jansen (1930–2014), Dutch boxer
Leen Korpershoek (1904–1989), Dutch swimmer
Leen Looijen (1947), Dutch football manager
Leen Quist (1942–2014), Dutch ceramist
Leen van der Waal (born 1928), Dutch engineer and former politician

References

See also
Leen (surname)

Feminine given names

Unisex given names